Suspension or suspended may refer to:

Science and engineering
 Car suspension
 Cell suspension or suspension culture, in biology
 Guarded suspension, a software design pattern in concurrent programming suspending a method call and the calling thread until a precondition (guard) is satisfied
 Magnetic suspension, a method by which an object is suspended with no support other than magnetic fields
 Suspension (topology), in mathematics
 Suspension (dynamical systems), in mathematics
 Suspension of a ring, in mathematics
 Suspension (chemistry), small solid particles suspended in a liquid
Colloidal suspension
 Suspension (mechanics), system allowing a machine to move smoothly with reduced shock
 Suspensory behavior, arboreal locomotion of primates
 Suspend to disk, also known as hibernation, powering down a computer while retaining its state.
 The superstructure of a suspension bridge

Temporary revocation of privileges
 Suspension (punishment), temporary exclusion as a punishment
 Suspension from the UK parliament
 Suspension (Catholic canonical penalty)
 Suspension of driving privileges ("suspended driver's license")
 Administrative License Suspension (ALS), US, driving license suspension without a court hearing

Entertainment
 Suspension (music), one or more notes temporarily held before resolving to a chord tone
 Suspension (film), 2007 film directed by Alec Joler and Ethan Shaftel
 Suspended (film), 1987 Polish film
 Suspended (video game) (1983), an interactive fiction video game

Literature
 Suspension of disbelief, the intentional avoidance of critical thinking or logic in examining a work of fiction

Eroticism
 Suspension bondage, the act of suspending a human body using suspension ropes, cables, or chains
 Suspension (body modification), the act of suspending a human body from hooks that have been put through body piercings

See also
 Lock (computer science)
 Suspend and resume (disambiguation)
 Suspension, a form of scribal abbreviation in medieval manuscripts
 Suspended animation